Eddie Mackey (born 1979) is an Irish hurler who played as a centre-back for the Kilkenny senior team.

Mackey joined the team during the 2003 National League and was a regular member of the team for just two seasons. During that time he failed to win any honours at senior level.

At club level Mackey plays with Mooncoin.

References

1979 births
Living people
Mooncoin hurlers
Kilkenny inter-county hurlers